Karboğazı is a mountain pass in the vicinity of the borders of Mersin Province, Adana Province and Niğde Province, Turkey. It literally means "snow pass (strait)" in Turkish.

Situated in the middle and northeastern sector of Taurus Mountainous range and to the north of Gülek.

Karboğazı literally means "snow-pass". It is situated in a high valley around a tributary of Berdan River. The upper reaches of the valley are usually snow-covered. The location was officially included in the Tourism centers of Mersin Province. Just to the south of the snow covered pass, there is a plateau, which is a popular picnic area encircled by pine forests.

However, Karboğazı is more than a touristic center. This pass was the scene of one of the critical fights during the Turkish War of Independence on 27–28 May 1920, called the Karboğazı ambush. A memorial was erected in the picnic area to commemorate the event.

References

Mountain passes of Turkey
Tourist attractions in Mersin Province
Tarsus District
Ski areas and resorts in Turkey
Taurus Mountains
Landforms of Mersin Province